Utautai ga Uta Utai ni Kite Uta Utae to Iu ga Utautai ga Uta Utau dake Utaikire ba Uta Utau keredomo Utautai dake Uta Utaikirenai kara Uta Utawanu!? (歌うたいが歌うたいに来て　歌うたえと言うが　歌うたいが歌うたうだけうたい切れば　歌うたうけれども　歌うたいだけ　歌うたい切れないから　歌うたわぬ！？) is Japanese band Greeeen's fourth studio album, which was released on June 27, 2012. It reached the 2nd place on the Oricon Weekly Albums Chart.

The title is a tongue twister in Japanese, and roughly translates to "a singer asks me to sing a song; if I could sing a song like a singer sings a song, I would sing a song like a singer sings a song, but I cannot sing a song like a singer sings a song, so I will not sing a song."

Track listing
Uta Utawanu!? ~Ieru Kana~ (歌うたわぬ！？～言えるかな～)
weeeek
Saorashido (ソラシド)
Love Letter (.恋文～ラブレター～)
Green boys
Hana Uta (花唄)
Orange (オレンジ)
pride
Midori No Takeda (緑のたけだ)
GOOD LUCKY!!!!! 
Misenai Namida Ha, Kitto Itsuka (ミセナイナミダハ、きっといつか)
every
Wai Ha WaiWai De Iiwai ~Omae Wai?~ (ワイはワイワイでいいワイ～おまえワィ？～)
Oh!!!! Meiwaku!!!! (OH!!!! 迷惑!!!!)
Tomodachi No Uta (友達の唄)

References

Greeeen albums
2012 albums